The Pravoberezhna line is the first line of the Kyiv Light Rail, located in the western part of Kyiv. The tram corridor was opened on February 1, 1975, and remains to this day. Trams No 1, No 2, and No 3 run along the Pravoberezhna Line.

List of stations
The Pravoberezhna Line consists of a total of eleven full stations, served by routes No 1, No 2, and No 3. The line is serviced by the Shevchenka tram depot. Here is a full list of stations on the line:

References

External links
Article: "A brief history of the development of urban land transport in Kyiv" on KYIVPASTRANS website. Archive of the original on 2016-02-24. Cited 2021-08-02.
Kyiv high-speed tram on the Gorelektrotrans website. Archive of the original on 2013-01-11. (Russian)
Kyiv on the site "City Electric Transport" (Ukrainian) (Russian) (Belarusian) (English)
 highway in Kyiv with a high-speed tram line. - Kyiv: Kyivproekt, 1979. - 40 p., Ill. (in Russian)
Order of the Kyiv City State Administration of 1998–2010 on the reconstruction of the right-bank high-speed tram line
Chronology of line reconstruction

Kyiv Light Rail
Transport in Ukraine
Light rail in Ukraine
Railway lines opened in 1975
1975 establishments in Ukraine